Bartholomeus Roodenburch (29 June 1866 – 16 July 1939) was a Dutch backstroke swimmer who competed in the 1908 Summer Olympics in London.

Roodenburch was born in Amsterdam. Aged 42, he participated in the 100 meter backstroke competition of the 1908 Olympics, but he was eliminated in the first round, finishing 13th with a time of 1:36.2. He died in Oegstgeest.

References

1866 births
1939 deaths
Dutch male backstroke swimmers
Olympic swimmers of the Netherlands
Swimmers at the 1908 Summer Olympics
Swimmers from Amsterdam